Hallgeir Frank Krog (5 October 1954 – 23 December 2008) was a Norwegian actor.

Krog was born in Bergen. He started his career as a stage worker and extra at the theatre Den Nasjonale Scene, but later attended the Norwegian National Academy of Theatre. He appeared in several Norwegian films, mostly during the 1990s. He also became known for his role in the television series Offshore.

Krog was found dead in his Grünerløkka home on 23 December 2008.

Filmography
Kautokeino-opprøret (2008)
Morgan Kane: Døden er en ensom jeger (2001)
Red Indian (1998)
Tashunga (1996)
Offshore (TV, 1996)
I de beste familier (1994)
Solens sønn og månens datter (1993)
Dødelig kjemi (1992)
Haakon Haakonsen (1990)
Wayfarers (Landstrykere, 1989)
Brun bitter (1988)
Blücher (1988)
Hard asfalt (1986)

References

External links

1954 births
2008 deaths
Actors from Bergen
Norwegian male film actors
Norwegian male television actors
Oslo National Academy of the Arts alumni